Hayley Carter and Ena Shibahara were the defending champions, but chose not to participate.

Robin Anderson and Jessika Ponchet won the title, defeating Ann Li and Jamie Loeb in the final, 7–6(7–4), 6–7(5–7), [10–7].

Seeds

Draw

Draw

References

External Links
Main Draw

Kentucky Bank Tennis Championships - Doubles
Lexington Challenger